Varuna is a political literature book written and published in 1907 by German social Darwinist and racialist Willibald Hentschel. The book is named after the Hindu god Varuna. Hentschel declares the importance of racial purification of the Aryan race to history and calls for the unification of Germans in Eastern Europe into a German colony.

References

1907 non-fiction books
German books
Political books